Lake Leon is located in Eastland County and was created by the State Board of Water Engineers by impounding the Leon River. Lake Leon is found in the Brazos River and in the Cross Timbers ecoregion, more specifically the Cross Timbers Grand Prairie ecoregion.

Hydrology 
Aside from decreasing water levels due to hot, dry summer months, the water level is not susceptible to fluctuation.

History 
On July 8, 1952, the State Board of Water Engineers permitted the creation of Lake Leon. On January 13, 1953, the dam started construction, and the dam was efficiently blocking the waterway by April 1954. In June 1954, the dam was finished. Eastland County Water Supply District still uses Lake Leon both municipally and industrially as a water sources.

Recreation

Fishing 
In 1975 Florida largemouth bass entered Lake Leon, and since then the reservoir has become recognized for largemouth bass tournament fishing. Lake Leon additionally hosts channel catfish, sunfish, and white bass. There are no fishing regulations specific to Lake Leon, so statewide regulations are all applicable.

Boating 
Lake Leon does provide a boat dock for those that wish to use their boats recreationally.

Wildlife

Fauna 
The most populous fish are:

 largemouth bass
 white crappie
 channel catfish
 flathead catfish
 white bass

Flora 
The most populous hydrophilic vegetations are:

 floating-leaf pondweed
 bulrush
 water willow

References 

Wikipedia Student Program
Lakes of Texas